Kapas may refer to:
 Kapas Island, east of Marang, Malaysia
Kapas, Bojonegoro, district in East Java, Indonesia
Kapas Hera, town in Delhi state, India

People with the name
Andriej Kapaś (born 1989),Polish tennis player
Boglárka Kapás (born 1993), Hungarian swimmer

See also
Kapa (disambiguation)